Poland competed at the 2000 Summer Paralympics in Sydney, Australia. 113 competitors from Poland won 53 medals, including 19 gold, 22 silver and 12 bronze to finish 8th in the medal table.

Medal table

Basketball ID
After Spain's disqualification for cheating, Poland received the silver medal (previously bronze) while Russia received the gold medal (previously silver medal).

See also
Poland at the Paralympics
Poland at the 2000 Summer Olympics

References 

Nations at the 2000 Summer Paralympics
2000
Summer Paralympics